Roger Lindevall is a retired Swedish footballer. Lindevall made 19 Allsvenskan appearances for Djurgården and scored one goal.

References

Swedish footballers
Djurgårdens IF Fotboll players
Association footballers not categorized by position